Putnam House may refer to:

Connecticut 
 Putnam Cottage or Knapp's Tavern, a historic tavern where General Israel Putnam escaped the British forces

Massachusetts 
 Rea Putnam Fowler House, a historic house in Danvers
 Rev. Daniel Putnam House, a historic house in North Reading
 Deacon Edward Putnam Jr. House, a historic house in Middleton
 Edward Putnam House, a historic house in Sutton
 General Israel Putnam House, Danvers birthplace of Major General Israel Putnam
 James Putnam Jr. House, a historic house in Danvers
 Otis Putnam House, a historic house in Worcester
 General Rufus Putnam House, a National Historic Landmark in Rutland

Ohio 
 The Anchorage (Marietta, Ohio), also known as the Putnam House, in Harmar (Marietta), built by Douglas Putnam, great grandson of General Israel Putnam
 David Putnam House, site of the first bank corporation in the Northwest Territories, in Harmar (Marietta), built by David Putnam, grandson of General Israel Putnam and father of David Putnam, Jr., the abolitionist
 Rufus Putnam House, a historic home in Marietta, built by General Rufus Putnam